This is a list of convention centers in the United States by state or insular area.

By state

Alabama
Bald Rock Lodge (Cheaha State Park)
Bessemer Civic Center
Birmingham–Jefferson Convention Complex
Bryant Convention Center (Tuscaloosa)
Celebration Arena (Decatur)
Daphne Civic Center
Lake Guntersville State Park Conference Center
Lakepoint Resort Lodge (Eufaula)
Ozark Civic Center
Mobile Convention Center
Monte Sano State Park (Huntsville)
Pelham Civic Center
The Lodge at Gulf State Park (Gulf Shores)
Von Braun Center (Huntsville)

Alaska
Dena'ina Center 
Egan Center

Arizona
Mojave Crossing (Fort Mohave)
Phoenix Convention Center
Tucson Convention Center
Walkup Skydome (Flagstaff)
WestWorld (Scottsdale)
Mesa Convention Center (Mesa, Arizona)

Arkansas
Arkansas 4-H Center (Little Rock)
Arkansas Union (Fayetteville)
Arlington Hotel (Hot Springs)
Hot Springs Convention Center (Hot Springs)
Benton Event Center (Benton)
Brewer Hegeman Conference Center (Conway)
Brinkley Convention Center (Brinkley)
Donald W. Reynolds Campus and Community Center (Magnolia)
Fayetteville Town Center (Fayetteville)
First National Bank Arena (Jonesboro)
Fort Smith Convention Center (Fort Smith)
Heifer Ranch Conference & Retreat Center (Perryville)
Jacksonville Community Center (Jacksonville)
Northwest Arkansas Convention Center (Springdale)
Ozark Conference Center (Solgohachia)
Pine Bluff Convention Center (Pine Bluff)
Statehouse Convention Center (Little Rock)
Winthrop Rockefeller Institute (Morrilton)
L.E. “Gene” Durand Convention Center at Crockett Tower (Harrison)

California
Alameda County Fairgrounds (Pleasanton)
Anaheim Convention Center
Bill Graham Civic Auditorium (San Francisco)
Bren Events Center (Irvine)
Business Expo Center (Anaheim)
Carson Community Center
Centennial Hall Convention Center (Hayward)
Cow Palace (Daly City)
Del Mar Fairgrounds (Del Mar)
El Dorado County Fair (Placerville)
Eureka Municipal Auditorium
Fresno Convention Center
Granlibakken (Tahoe City)
Kaiser Convention Center (Oakland)
Long Beach Convention and Entertainment Center 
Los Angeles Convention Center 
Monterey Conference Center
Moscone Center (San Francisco)
Oakland Convention Center
Palm Springs Convention Center
Pasadena Civic Auditorium
Paso Robles Event Center
Rabobank Theater and Convention Center (Bakersfield)
Riverside Convention Center
Sacramento Convention Center 
San Diego Convention Center 
San Jose Convention Center 
Santa Clara Convention Center
Santa Monica Civic Auditorium
Shrine Auditorium (Los Angeles)
Visalia Convention Center
160th Regiment State Armory (Los Angeles)

Colorado
Colorado Convention Center (Denver)
Island Grove (Greeley)

Connecticut
Connecticut Convention Center (Hartford)
XL Center (Hartford)

Delaware
Chase Center on the Riverfront  (Wilmington)

District of Columbia
Ronald Reagan Building and International Trade Center
Walter E. Washington Convention Center

Florida
Broward County Convention Center (Fort Lauderdale)
Clemente Center (Melbourne)
Donald L. Tucker Center (Tallahassee)
Emerald Coast Convention Center (Okaloosa Island/Destin)
Knight International Center (Miami)
Miami Airport Convention Center (Miami)
Miami Beach Convention Center
Ocean Center (Daytona Beach)
Orange County Convention Center (Orlando)
Palm Beach County Convention Center (West Palm Beach)
Prime F. Osborn III Convention Center (Jacksonville)
Tampa Convention Center
Volusia County Fair and Expo Center (DeLand)

Georgia
Atlanta Exposition Centers
Classic Center (Athens, Georgia)
Cobb Galleria Centre (Atlanta)
Georgia International Convention Center (College Park)
Georgia World Congress Center (Atlanta)
Gas South Arena (Duluth)
James Brown Arena (Augusta)
Macon City Auditorium (Macon)
Savannah International Trade and Convention Center (Savannah)

Hawaii
Hawai'i Convention Center (Honolulu)

Idaho
Boise Centre
Idaho Center (Nampa)

Illinois
Bank of Springfield Center (Springfield)
Donald E. Stephens Convention Center (Rosemont)
McCormick Place (Chicago)
Oakley-Lindsay Center (Quincy) 
Odeum Expo Center (demolished) (Villa Park)
Peoria Civic Center 
Progress City USA (Decatur)
Renaissance Schaumburg Convention Center Hotel
Vibrant Arena at The MARK (Moline)
Tinley Park Convention Center

Indiana
Allen County War Memorial Coliseum and Exposition Center (Fort Wayne)
Old National Events Plaza (Evansville)
Century Center (South Bend)
Genesis Convention Center (Gary)
Grand Wayne Convention Center (Fort Wayne)
Honeywell Center (Wabash)
Indiana Convention Center (Indianapolis)

Iowa
Grand River Event Center (Dubuque)
Iowa Events Center (Des Moines)
Mid-America Center (Council Bluffs)
Quad Cities Waterfront Convention Center (Bettendorf)
RiverCenter (Davenport)
Alliant Energy PowerHouse (Cedar Rapids)

Kansas
Century II Convention Hall (Wichita)
Overland Park Convention Center

Kentucky
Eastern Kentucky Exposition Center (Pikeville)
Frankfort Convention Center
Kentucky Exposition Center (Louisville)
Kentucky International Convention Center (Louisville)
Central Bank Center (Lexington)
Northern Kentucky Convention Center  (Covington)
The Center for Rural Development (Somerset)

Louisiana
Alario Center (Westwego)
Blackham Coliseum (Lafayette)
Bossier Civic Center (Bossier City)
Burton Coliseum (Lake Charles)
Cajundome (Lafayette)
Frederick J. Sigur Civic Center (Chalmette)
Houma Terrebonne Civic Center (Houma)
Ike Hamilton Expo Center (West Monroe)
Lake Charles Civic Center
Lamar Dixon Expo Center (Gonzales)
Mercedes-Benz Superdome (New Orleans)
Municipal Auditorium (New Orleans)
Natchitoches Events Center
New Orleans Morial Convention Center
Pontchartrain Center (Kenner)
Raising Cane's River Center (Baton Rouge)
Rapides Parish Coliseum (Alexandria)
Shreveport Convention Center
Smoothie King Center (New Orleans)
Thomas Assembly Center (Ruston)
University Center (Hammond)
Vidalia Convention Center (Vidalia)
Warren J. Harang Jr. Municipal Auditorium (Thibodaux)

Maine
Cross Insurance Center (Bangor)
Portland Maine Convention Center

Maryland
Aspen Institute Wye River Conference Centers (Queenstown)
Baltimore Convention Center
Belmont Estate (Belmont Conference Center) (Moore's Morning Choice) (Elkridge)
Gaylord National Resort & Convention Center (National Harbor)
Roland E. Powell Convention Center (Ocean City)
UMUC Inn & Conference Center (Adelphi)

Massachusetts
Bayside Expo Center (Boston) – sold in 2010 to the University of Massachusetts Boston for future redevelopment
Boston Convention and Exhibition Center (Boston)
DCU Center (Worcester)
Hynes Convention Center (Boston)
Massachusetts Convention Center Authority
MassMutual Center (Springfield)

Michigan
DeVos Place Convention Center (Grand Rapids)
Dort Financial Events Center (Flint)
Lansing Center (Lansing)
Superior Dome (Marquette)
Suburban Collection Showplace (Novi)
Huntington Place (Detroit)

Minnesota
Duluth Entertainment Convention Center (DECC) (Duluth)
Mayo Civic Center (Rochester)
Minneapolis Convention Center (Minneapolis)
RiverCentre (Saint Paul)
River's Edge Convention Center (Saint Cloud)
Mayo Clinic Health System Event Center (Mankato)

Mississippi
Hattiesburg Lake Terrace Convention Center (Hattiesburg)
Jackson Convention Complex (Jackson)

Missouri
America's Center (St. Louis)
Bartle Hall Convention Center (Kansas City)
St. Charles Convention Center (St. Charles, Missouri)
Branson Convention Center (Branson)

Nebraska
CenturyLink Center Omaha

Nevada

Cashman Center (Las Vegas)
Las Vegas Convention Center (Las Vegas)
Mandalay Bay Convention Center (Las Vegas)
MGM Grand Hotel and Casino (Las Vegas)
Sands Expo (Las Vegas)
Reno-Sparks Convention Center  (Reno)

New Jersey
Atlantic City Convention Center (Atlantic City)
Garden State Exhibit Center (Somerset)
Historic Atlantic City Convention Hall (frequently called Boardwalk Hall) (Atlantic City)
New Jersey Convention and Exposition Center (Edison)
Meadowlands Exposition Center (Secaucus)
Wildwoods Convention Center (Wildwood)

New Mexico
Albuquerque Convention Center (Albuquerque)
Santa Fe Community Convention Center (Santa Fe)

New York
Albany Capital Center (Albany) 
Brooklyn Expo Center (Brooklyn, New York City)
Buffalo Niagara Convention Center (Buffalo)
The Dome Center (Henrietta)
Empire Expo Center (Syracuse)
Jacob K. Javits Convention Center (Manhattan, New York City)
Madison Square Garden (Manhattan, New York City)
Madison Square Garden (1890) (demolished) (Manhattan, New York City)
Madison Square Garden (1925) (demolished) (Manhattan, New York City)
Nassau Veterans Memorial Coliseum (Uniondale)
New York Coliseum (demolished) (Manhattan, New York City)
New York Expo Center (Hunts Point, Bronx)
Oncenter (Syracuse)
Joseph A. Floreano Rochester Riverside Convention Center (Rochester)
Westchester County Center (White Plains)

North Carolina
Charlotte Convention Center (Charlotte)
Durham Convention Center (Durham)
The Empire Room (Greensboro)
Joseph S. Koury Convention Center (Greensboro)
M. C. Benton Convention Center (Winston-Salem)
Raleigh Convention Center (Raleigh)
Wilmington Convention Center (Wilmington)

Ohio
Dayton Convention Center (Dayton)
Duke Energy Convention Center (Cincinnati)
Greater Columbus Convention Center (Columbus)
Huntington Convention Center of Cleveland and Global Center for Health Innovation
International Exposition (I-X) Center (Cleveland)
John S. Knight Center (Akron)
SeaGate Centre (Toledo)
Sharonville Convention Center (Cincinnati)

Oklahoma
Cox Business Center (formerly Tulsa Convention Center) (Tulsa)
Oklahoma City Convention Center (Oklahoma City)
QuikTrip Center (Tulsa)

Oregon
Portland Expo Center (Portland)
Oregon Convention Center (Portland)
Seaside Civic and Convention Center (Seaside)
Salem Convention Center (Salem)

Pennsylvania
Bayfront Convention Center (Erie)
Blair County Convention Center (Altoona)
Carlisle Expo Center (Carlisle)
David L. Lawrence Convention Center (Pittsburgh)
Frank J. Pasquerilla Conference Center (Johnstown)
Greater Philadelphia Expo Center (Oaks)
Greater Reading Expo Center (closed) (Reading)
Hershey Lodge and Convention Center (Hershey)
Lancaster County Convention Center (Lancaster)
Pennsylvania Convention Center (Philadelphia)
Pennsylvania Farm Show Complex & Expo Center (Harrisburg)
York Expo Center (York)

Rhode Island
Rhode Island Convention Center (Providence)

South Carolina
TD Convention Center (Greenville)
Charleston Area Convention Center (Charleston)
Columbia Metropolitan Convention Center (Columbia)
Myrtle Beach Convention Center (Myrtle Beach)
Spartanburg Expo & Event Center (Spartanburg)

South Dakota
Sioux Falls Convention Center (Sioux Falls)

Tennessee
Gatlinburg Convention Center (Gatlinburg)
Gaylord Opryland Resort & Convention Center (Nashville)
Knoxville Convention Center (Knoxville)
Memphis Cook Convention Center (Memphis)
Music City Center (Nashville)

Texas
American Bank Center (Corpus Christi)
Amarillo Civic Center (Amarillo)
Austin Convention Center (Austin)
Beaumont Civic Center (Beaumont)
Curtis Culwell Center (Garland)
Ford Arena (Beaumont)
Fort Worth Convention Center
Freeman Coliseum (San Antonio)
George R. Brown Convention Center (Houston)
Henderson Exposition Center (Lufkin)
Henry B. Gonzalez Convention Center (San Antonio)
Irving Convention Center at Las Colinas (Irving)
Kay Bailey Hutchison Convention Center (Dallas)
Lubbock Memorial Civic Center (Lubbock)
Kay Yeager Colosseum (Wichita Falls)
Killeen Civic and Conference Center (Killeen)
Merrell Center (Katy)
McAllen Convention Center (McAllen)
Montagne Center (Beaumont)
NRG Center (Houston)
Pitser Garrison Convention Center  (Lufkin)
South Padre Island Convention Centre (South Padre Island)
The Oil Palace (Tyler)
Waco Convention Center (Waco)
Williams Convention Center (El Paso)

Utah
 David Eccles Conference Center (Ogden)
 Davis Conference Center (Layton)
 Dixie Center (St. George)
 Golden Spike Arena (Ogden)
 Salt Palace (Salt Lake City)
 Mountain America Expo Center (Sandy)
 Utah Valley Convention Center (Provo)

Virginia
Chesapeake Conference Center (Chesapeake)
Greater Richmond Convention Center (Richmond)
Hampton Roads Convention Center (Hampton)
The National Conference Center (Lansdowne)
Virginia Beach Convention Center (Virginia Beach)
Fredericksburg Expo & Conference Center (Fredericksburg)

Washington
Greater Tacoma Convention and Trade Center (Tacoma)
Lynnwood Event Center (Lynnwood)
Meydenbauer Center (Bellevue)
Spokane Convention Center (Spokane)
Three Rivers Convention Center (Tri-Cities)
Seattle Convention Center (Seattle)
Yakima Convention Center (Yakima)

West Virginia
Beckley-Raleigh County Convention Center (Beckley)
Big Sandy Superstore Arena (Huntington)
Charleston Civic Center (Charleston)
Morgantown Event Center (Morgantown)

Wisconsin
Alliant Energy Center (Madison)
Fox Cities Exhibition Center (Appleton) 
Kalahari Resorts (Wisconsin Dells)
Monona Terrace (Madison)
Resch Expo (Ashwaubenon)
Shopko Hall (Closed) (Ashwaubenon)
Wisconsin Center (Milwaukee)

Wyoming
Headwaters Arts and Conference Center (Dubois)

By insular area

Puerto Rico

By size
Convention centers are sorted by gross facility square footage and then by gross exhibit hall square footage.

See also
List of convention and exhibition centers
List of convention centers named after people

References